Park Kwang-il (born 10 February 1991) is a South Korean footballer who plays as a midfielder for Gyeongnam.

Club statistics
Updated to 28 July 2017.

References

External links

Profile at Ehime FC

1991 births
Living people
South Korean footballers
Yonsei University alumni
J2 League players
K League 1 players
Indian Super League players
Matsumoto Yamaga FC players
PKNS F.C. players
FC Pune City players
Mito HollyHock players
Ehime FC players
Jeonnam Dragons players
Gyeongnam FC players
South Korean expatriate sportspeople in Japan
South Korean expatriate sportspeople in India
Expatriate footballers in Japan
Expatriate footballers in India
Association football wingers
Association football fullbacks